Wiktor Julian Biegański (16 November 1892 – 19 January 1974) was a Polish actor, film director and screenwriter. He appeared in 24 films between 1919 and 1966. He also directed eleven films between 1921 and 1929.

Selected filmography

Actor
 The Drama of the St. Mary's Church Tower (1913)
 Charlotte Corday (1919)
 Bezimienni bohaterowie (1932)
 Dvanáct křesel (1933)
 His Excellency, The Shop Assistant (1933)
 Zabawka (1933)
 Młody Las (1934)
 Co mój mąż robi w nocy (1934)
 Pieśniarz Warszawy (1934)
 Jaśnie pan szofer (1935)

Director
 The Drama of the St. Mary's Church Tower (1913)
 The Adventures of Anton (1913)
 Pan Twardowski (1921)
 Jealousy (1922)
 The Abyss of Repentance (1923)
 The Idol (1923)
 Vampires of Warsaw (1925)
 The Little Eagle (1923)
 The Polish Marathon (1927)
 Pawns of Passion (1928)
 The Woman Who Desires Sin (1929)

References

External links

1892 births
1974 deaths
People from Sambir
People from the Kingdom of Galicia and Lodomeria
Polish Austro-Hungarians
Polish male film actors
Polish male silent film actors
20th-century Polish male actors
Polish film directors
Recipients of the Order of Polonia Restituta
20th-century Polish screenwriters
Male screenwriters
20th-century Polish male writers